The Spoornet Classic was a golf tournament in South Africa that was played on the Sunshine Tour. Winners include Retief Goosen, who would go on to win two U.S. Opens, and Ernie Els, who went on the win two U.S. Opens and two Open Championships.

In 1992, it had one of the richest purses on the Tour at that time, offering R 47,130 to the winner.

Winners

References

Former Sunshine Tour events